The School for Atheists: A Novella=Comedy in 6 Acts (Die Schule der Atheisten) is a novel by Arno Schmidt. It was originally published in German in 1972. It was translated into English by John E. Woods and published by Green Integer in 2001.

Summary
The novel is presented as an experimental drama, making extensive use of Schmidt's playful language and typography. The story is set in 2014 and it concerns a summit of world leaders. The summit is held at the home of William T. Kolderup in Tellingstedt. A nested narrative in this story is that of the adventures of Kolderup and the mother of Isis, the American Secretary of State. In Kolderup's story, the ship that carries him and the mother of Isis is wrecked, testing the atheistic beliefs of the stranded characters.

Atheism
German philosophical novels
1972 German novels
Novels by Arno Schmidt